Goler Memorial African Methodist Episcopal Zion Church, also known as Old Goler, is a historic African Methodist Episcopal Zion church located at 630 Patterson Avenue in Winston-Salem, Forsyth County, North Carolina.  It was built in 1918–1919, and is a rectangular brick building in the Late Gothic Revival style.  It features a gable-front block flanked by two square brick towers and stained glass windows.  A two-story annex was built in 1946.  In 1942, the Goler Metropolitan AME Zion Church congregation split from the Goler Memorial African Methodist Episcopal Zion Church.

It was listed on the National Register of Historic Places in 1998.

References

African-American history in Winston-Salem, North Carolina
African Methodist Episcopal Zion churches in North Carolina
Churches in Winston-Salem, North Carolina
Churches on the National Register of Historic Places in North Carolina
Gothic Revival church buildings in North Carolina
Churches completed in 1919
20th-century Methodist church buildings in the United States
National Register of Historic Places in Winston-Salem, North Carolina